Bernard Gérard (born August 29, 1953) is a member of the National Assembly of France.  He represents the Nord department,  and is a member of the Union for a Popular Movement.

References

1953 births
People from Valenciennes
Living people
Union for a Popular Movement politicians
Deputies of the 13th National Assembly of the French Fifth Republic
Deputies of the 14th National Assembly of the French Fifth Republic
Mayors of places in Hauts-de-France